Montrouziera is a genus of shrubs to large trees in the family Clusiaceae, endemic to New Caledonia. As usual in the Clusiaceae, species of this genus are known to contain xanthonoids. Montrouziera is related to the South American genus Platonia. Locally known as "houp", this genus was named after Xavier Montrouzier.

Montrouziera gabriellae is noted for bearing the largest endemic flower of New Caledonia.

References

 
Endemic flora of New Caledonia
Malpighiales genera